The California Raisins: The Grape Escape is a California Raisins video game developed by Radiance for the Nintendo Entertainment System. Capcom planned to publish the game in 1990 but its release was canceled due to the California Raisins' dwindling popularity because of the decline in raisin sales in the late 1980s and early 1990s.

Gameplay

In the single-player side-scrolling action game the player controls a California Raisin through five stages in an effort to rescue the band and their band's musical notes that were stolen by the gang of jealous musicians.  The player can walk, jump, climb on vines, moonwalk (by pressing the "select" button) and shoot an unlimited supply of grape jelly beans as projectiles.  During each level the player can collect 'I' icons that provide temporary invincibility, regular black musical notes for bonus points, 'Sunshine' icons to restore health, and 'Raisinette' icons to give an extra life to the player. One can also locate items by shooting at the thin air or at columns.

As was the case with other Capcom games, such as Mega Man and DuckTales, one can play the first four levels in any order, but the final level is only available after collecting the musical notes from each of the four levels. The first four levels include The Grape Vine, The Factory, The Maize Maze and The Juicery. The final level takes place in The Clouds.

Cancellation
The game was canceled due to the California Raisins dwindling popularity because of the downfall sales of raisins in the late 1980s/early 1990s. The game appeared to have been largely finished as it was given a full review, along with hints, by the "Game Player's Encyclopedia of Nintendo Games Vol. 3." Flyers included with Capcom NES games released around 1990 also included the title as an upcoming game.

Secondary market
The beta cartridge for the game was sold for approximately $1000.

References

1990 video games
Cancelled Nintendo Entertainment System games
Capcom games
Nintendo Entertainment System-only games
Nintendo Entertainment System games
Video games about food and drink
Video games developed in the United States
Advergames
Works based on advertisements